Karolína Plíšková was the defending champion, but lost in the third round to Catherine Bellis.

Petra Kvitová won the title, defeating Garbiñe Muguruza in the final, 3–6, 6–3, 6–4.

Caroline Wozniacki and Simona Halep were in contention for the WTA no. 1 singles ranking at the beginning of the tournament. Wozniacki retained the no. 1 ranking when she won her quarterfinal match and Halep withdrew from the semifinals.

Seeds
The top eight seeds received a bye into the second round.

Draw

Finals

Top half

Section 1

Section 2

Bottom half

Section 3

Section 4

Qualifying

Seeds

Qualifiers

Draw

First qualifier

Second qualifier

Third qualifier

Fourth qualifier

Fifth qualifier

Sixth qualifier

Seventh qualifier

Eighth qualifier

References

External links
Main Draw
Qualifying Draw

Singles